Big Brother 20 is the twentieth season of various versions of television show Big Brother and may refer to:

 Big Brother 20 (U.S.), the 2018 edition of the U.S. version
 Big Brother Brasil 20, the 2020 edition of the Brazilian version
Big Brother 20 (UK), the 2023 edition of the British version